This is a list of pianists of whom recordings survive who play (or played) classical music.

For a more inclusive list not limited to recorded pianists, see also List of classical pianists (solo pianists) and List of classical piano duos (performers) (piano duos, trios, etc.).

A

 Behzod Abduraimov
 Jacques Abram
 Dag Achatz
 Joaquín Achúcarro
 Adolovni Acosta
 Daniel Adni
 Adrian Aeschbacher
 Valery Afanassiev
 Guido Agosti
 Soojin Ahn
 Pierre-Laurent Aimard
 Webster Aitken
 Nelly Akopian-Tamarina
 Giuseppe Albanese
 Isaac Albéniz
 Eugen d'Albert
 Charlie Albright
 Dimitri Alexeev
 Victor Aller
 Ilse von Alpenheim
 Louis Demetrius Alvanis
 Donna Amato
 Géza Anda
 Piotr Anderszewski
 Leif Ove Andsnes
 Nicholas Angelich
 Agustin Anievas
 Eteri Andjaparidze
 Conrad Ansorge
 Anton Arensky
 Martha Argerich
 Nareh Arghamanyan
 Kit Armstrong
 Yvonne Arnaud
 Claudio Arrau
 Lydia Artymiw
 Şahan Arzruni
 Stefan Askenase
 Vladimir Ashkenazy
 Winifred Atwell
 Lera Auerbach
 Håkon Austbø
 Myriam Avalos
 Yulianna Avdeeva
 Emanuel Ax

B

 Sergei Babayan
 Stanley Babin
 Victor Babin
 Gina Bachauer
 Fridtjof Backer-Grøndahl
 Wilhelm Backhaus
 Paul Badura-Skoda
 Ryszard Bakst
 Dalton Baldwin
 Ernő Balogh
 Artur Balsam
 Volker Banfield
 Joseph Banowetz
 Pierre Barbizet
 Daniel Barenboim
 Simon Barere
 David Bar-Illan
 Trevor Barnard
 Rami Bar-Niv
 Béla Bartók
 Dimitri Bashkirov
 Elena Bashkirova
 Edmund Battersby
 Harold Bauer
 Paul Baumgartner
 Jean-Efflam Bavouzet
 Alessio Bax
 Mark Bebbington
 Betty Humby Beecham (Lady Beecham)
 Jozef De Beenhouwer
 Jeanne Behrend
 Elena Beckman-Shcherbina
 Giovanni Bellucci
 Nelly Ben-Or (Clynes)
 Arturo Benedetti Michelangeli
 Richard Rodney Bennett
 Boris Berezovsky
 Martin Berkofsky
 Bart Berman
 Boris Berman
 Lazar Berman
 Leonard Bernstein
 Michel Béroff
 Stephen Beus
 Sondra Bianca
 Philippe Bianconi
 Fabio Bidini
 Malcolm Bilson
 Malcolm Binns
 İdil Biret
 Tessa Birnie
 Sari Biro
 Hans Bischoff
 Stephen Bishop (see Kovacevich)
 William Black
 Easley Blackwood
 Rafał Blechacz
 Michel Block
 Fannie Bloomfield Zeisler
 Daniel Blumenthal
 Felicja Blumental
 Mary Louise Boehm
 Gergely Bogányi
 Moissaye Boguslawski
 Jorge Bolet
 Stefano Bollani
 Coenraad V. Bos
 Hélène Boschi
 Nadia Boulanger
 Hendrik Bouman
 Andreas Boyde
 Emma Boynet
 Evgeni Bozhanov
 Johannes Brahms
 Alexander Brailowsky
 Natan Brand
 Ronald Brautigam
 Alfred Brendel
 Benjamin Britten
 Yefim Bronfman
 The 5 Browns
 Deondra
 Desirae
 Gregory
 Melody
 Ryan
 Ian Brown
 John Browning
 Bruce Brubaker
 Rudolf Buchbinder
 Sara Davis Buechner
 Richard Buhlig
 Josef Bulva
 Khatia Buniatishvili
 Stanislav Bunin
 Geoffrey Burleson
 Ammiel Bushakevitz
 Ferruccio Busoni

C

 Sarah Cahill
 Matthew Cameron
 Michele Campanella
 Bruno Canino
 Claire and Antoinette Cann
 Boris Cepeda
 John Carmichael
 Roberto Carnevale
 Teresa Carreño (piano rolls only)
 Gaby Casadesus
 Jean Casadesus
 Robert Casadesus
 Gianluca Cascioli
 Ricardo Castro
 Bertrand Chamayou
 Cécile Chaminade
 Alton Chung Ming Chan
 Angelin Chang
 Abram Chasins
 Chen Pi-hsien
 Sa Chen
 Angela Cheng
 Shura Cherkassky
 Rachel Cheung
 Jan Chiapusso
 Gian Paolo Chiti
 Zlata Chochieva
 Daniel Chorzempa
 Winifred Christie
 Myung-whun Chung
 Marcel Ciampi
 Dino Ciani
 Aldo Ciccolini
 Tamara Anna Cislowska
 Richard Clayderman
 Van Cliburn
 France Clidat
 Julian Cochran
 Arnaldo Cohen
 Harriet Cohen
 Maurice Cole
 Naida Cole
 Catherine Collard
 Jean-Philippe Collard
 Finghin Collins
 Graziella Concas
 Sylvia Constantinidis
 John Contiguglia
 Richard Contiguglia
 Stephen Coombs
 Gary Cooper
 Imogen Cooper
 Joseph Cooper
 George Copeland
 Aaron Copland
 Chick Corea
 Alfred Cortot
 Romola Costantino
 Henry Cowell
 Patrick Crommelynck
 Tan Crone
 Christine Croshaw
 Jill Crossland
 Paul Crossley
 Lamar Crowson
 José Cubiles
 Clifford Curzon
 Halina Czerny-Stefańska
 Georges Cziffra

D

 Michel Dalberto
 Dang Thai Son
 Jeanne-Marie Darré
 Fanny Davies
 Bella Davidovich
 Ivan Davis
 Claude Debussy
 Sylviane Deferne
 Arthur De Greef
 Cor de Groot
 Steven De Groote
 Eduardo Delgado
 Nikolai Demidenko
 Jörg Demus
 Jeremy Denk
 Anthony di Bonaventura
 Misha Dichter
 Louis Diémer
 Andrei Diev
 Shani Diluka
 Liuben Dimitrov
 Simone Dinnerstein
 Paul Doguereau
 Ernő Dohnányi
 Joanna Domańska
 Peter Donohoe
 Sergei Dorensky
 Ania Dorfmann
 Marylene Dosse
 Barry Douglas
 Danny Driver
 Zbigniew Drzewiecki
 Florence Kirsch Du Brul
 François-René Duchâble
 François Dumont
 Duo Tal & Groethuysen

E

 Akiko Ebi
 Severin von Eckardstein
 Nicolas Economou
 Bracha Eden
 Richard Egarr
 Pavel Egorov
 Youri Egorov
 Severin Eisenberger
 Detlev Eisinger
 Jan Ekier
 Abdel Rahman El Bacha
 Edson Elias
 Emre Elivar
 Michael Endres
 Per Enflo
 Karl Engel
 Brigitte Engerer
 Philippe Entremont
 Richard Epstein
 Christoph Eschenbach
 Morton Estrin
 Róża Etkin-Moszkowska
 Lindley Evans

F

 Mikhaïl Faerman
 Joel Fan
 Edith Farnadi
 Richard Farrell
 José Feghali
 Alan Feinberg
 Samuil Feinberg
 Till Fellner
 Vladimir Feltsman
 Gordon Fergus-Thompson
 Arthur Ferrante
 Jacques Février
 Janina Fialkowska
 Margaret Fingerhut
 Sergio Fiorentino
 Rudolf Firkušný
 Annie Fischer
 Caroline Fischer
 Edwin Fischer
 Norma Fisher
 Philip Edward Fisher
 Leon Fleisher
 Yakov Flier
 Ingrid Fliter
 Andor Földes
 Bengt Forsberg
 Lukas Foss
 Philip Fowke
 Fou Ts'ong
 Malcolm Frager
 Homero Francesch
 Samson François
 Claude Frank
 Peter Frankl
 Justus Frantz
 David Fray
 Nelson Freire
 Etelka Freund
 Carl Friedberg
 Ilya Friedberg
 Arthur Friedheim
 Ignaz Friedman
 Benjamin Frith
 Herbert Fryer
 Kotaro Fukuma
 David Fung
 Margarita Fyodorova

G

 Gábor Gabos
 Ossip Gabrilowitsch
 Irwin Gage
 Neil Galanter
 Rudolph Ganz
 Mark Gasser
 Ivana Gavrić
 Andrei Gavrilov
 Alexander Gavrylyuk
 Bruno Leonardo Gelber
 Kemal Gekić
 Aglika Genova
 Valentin Gheorghiu
 Lorenzo Ghielmi
 Alexander Ghindin
 Jack Gibbons
 Walter Gieseking
 Emil Gilels
 Rhondda Gillespie
 Boris Giltburg
 Jakob Gimpel
 Håvard Gimse
 Stéphane Ginsburgh
 Grigory Ginzburg
 Katrine Gislinge
 Frank Glazer
 Bernd Glemser
 Leopold Godowsky
 Nelson Goerner
 Alexander Goldenweiser
 Robert Goldsand
 Alexis Golovin
 David Golub
 Richard Goode
 Isador Goodman
 Judith Gordon
 Vera Gornostayeva
 Sascha Gorodnitzki
 Daniel Gortler
 Ralf Gothóni
 Glenn Gould
 Anna Gourari
 Enrique Graf
 Gary Graffman
 Percy Grainger
 Carlo Grante
 Arthur Greene
 David Greilsammer
 Antony Grey
 Jeffrey Grice
 Edvard Grieg
 Dan Grigore
 Hélène Grimaud
 Maria Grinberg
 Bonnie Gritton
 Andreas Groethuysen
 Benjamin Grosvenor
 Alfred Grünfeld
 Andrei Gugnin
 Friedrich Gulda
 Youra Guller
 Horacio Gutiérrez
 László Gyimesi
 Ádám György

H

 Monique Haas
 Werner Haas
 Michael Habermann
 Ingrid Haebler
 Andreas Haefliger
 Reynaldo Hahn
 Adolph Hallis
 Mark Hambourg
 Leonid Hambro
 Marc-André Hamelin
 Ambre Hammond
 Yoonjung Han
 Adam Harasiewicz
 Wolf Harden
 Michael Kieran Harvey
 Clara Haskil
 Joyce Hatto
 Walter Hautzig
 Endre Hegedűs
 Inna Heifetz
 Eero Heinonen
 Claude Helffer
 David Helfgott
 Gerard Hengeveld
 Dennis Hennig
 Myra Hess
 Barbara Hesse-Bukowska
 Angela Hewitt
 Peter Hill
 Robert Hill
 Eric Himy
 Christopher Hinterhuber
 Ian Hobson
 Josef Hofmann
 Leonard Hokanson
 Vladimir Horowitz
 Mieczysław Horszowski
 Andrej Hoteev
 Stephen Hough
 Michael Houstoun
 Alan Hovhaness
 Leslie Howard
 Philip Howard
 Roy Howat
 Fei-Ping Hsu
 Helen Huang
 Jean Hubeau
 Engelbert Humperdinck
 Bruce Hungerford
 Frank Hutchens

I

 Stanislav Igolinsky
 Valentina Igoshina
 Konstantin Igumnov
 Ivan Ilić
 Jos Van Immerseel
 Eugen Indjic
 Stanislav Ioudenitch
 Clelia Iruzun
 Yoram Ish-Hurwitz
 Eugene Istomin
 Amparo Iturbi
 José Iturbi
 Christian Ivaldi
 Andrei Ivanovitch

J

 Peter Jablonski
 Paul Jacobs
 Ahmad Jamal
 Zoran G. Jančić
 Jenő Jandó
 Byron Janis
 Tasso Janopoulo
 Rudolf Jansen
 Gintaras Januševičius
 Dina Joffe
 Jovianney Emmanuel Cruz
 Grant Johannesen
 Gunnar Johansen
 Graham Johnson
 Henry Jolles
 Maryla Jonas
 Martin Jones
 Bradley Joseph
 Geneviève Joy-Dutilleux
 Eileen Joyce
 Terence Judd

K

 Ilona Kabos
 Jeffrey Kahane
 Percy Kahn
 Joseph Kalichstein
 Gilbert Kalish
 Valentina Kameníková
 Hans Kann
 Isata Kanneh-Mason
 William Kapell
 Richard Kapp
 Danae Kara
 Natalia Karp
 Yakov Kasman
 Andrey Kasparov
 Julius Katchen
 Peter Katin
 Cyprien Katsaris
 Amir Katz
 Martin Katz
 Mindru Katz
 Klaus Kaufmann
 Constance Keene
 Rudolf Kehrer
 Freddy Kempf
 Wilhelm Kempff
 Kevin Kenner
 Louis Kentner
 Olga Kern
 Stanislav Khegai
 Frederick B. Kiddle
 Edward Kilenyi
 Angela Jia Kim
 Benjamin Kim
 Paul Kim
 Izumi Kimura
 Gary Kirkpatrick
 John Kirkpatrick
 Evgeny Kissin
 Anatole Kitain
 Margaret Kitchin
 Ivan Klánský
 Dmitri Klebanov
 Elisabeth Klein
 Jacques Klein
 Walter Klien
 Eva Knardahl
 Alexander Kobrin
 Tobias Koch
 Zoltán Kocsis
 Raoul Koczalski
 Mari Kodama
 Alan Kogosowski
 Pavel Kolesnikov
 Lubka Kolessa
 Alfons Kontarsky
 Aloys Kontarsky
 Yu Kosuge
 Giorgio Koukl
 Stephen Kovacevich
 Denis Kozhukhin
 Vladimir Krainev
 Boris Krajný
 Lili Kraus
 Anna Kravtchenko
 Leonid Kreutzer
 Vladimir Krpan
 Antonín Kubálek
 Anton Kuerti
 Elena Kuschnerova
 Taeko Kuwata
 Leonid Kuzmin
 Radoslav Kvapil
 Rena Kyriakou

L

 Katia Labèque
 Marielle Labèque
 Monique de La Bruchollerie
 Frank La Forge
 Juhani Lagerspetz
 Frederic Lamond
 Geoffrey Lancaster
 Walter Landauer
 Wanda Landowska
 Piers Lane
 Lang Lang
 Milan Langer
 Cosimo Damiano Lanza
 André Laplante
 Adelina de Lara
 Ruth Laredo
 Alicia de Larrocha
 Ervin László
 Jacob Lateiner
 Risto Lauriala
 George-Emmanuel Lazaridis
 Dejan Lazić
 Igor Lazko
 Philip Ledger
 Colleen Lee
 Lee Kum-Sing
 Amy Lee
 Noël Lee
 Yvonne Lefébure
 Claire-Marie Le Guay
 Kurt Leimer
 Ralph Leopold
 Christian Leotta
 Simon Lepper
 Theodor Leschetizky
 Ray Lev
 Eric Le Van
 Oscar Levant
 Beth Levin
 Robert Levin Norwegian pianist
 Robert Levin American pianist
 James Levine
 Igor Levit
 Mischa Levitzki
 Daniel Levy
 Ernst Levy
 Raymond Lewenthal
 Paul Lewis
 Josef Lhévinne
 Rosina Lhévinne
 George Li
 Ming-Qiang Li
 Yundi Li
 Liberace
 Francesco Libetta
 Cecile Licad
 John Lill
 Dong-Hyek Lim
 Dong-Min Lim
 Arthur Moreira Lima
 Jenny Lin
 Dinu Lipatti
 Jan Lisiecki
 Valentina Lisitsa
 James Lisney
 Eugene List
 Andrew Litton
 Peter Lockwood
 Arthur Loesser
 Nicolai Lomov
 Kathleen Long
 Marguerite Long
 Thomas Lorango
 Roger Lord
 Wolfram Lorenzen
 Yvonne Loriod
 Louis Lortie
 Iris Loveridge
 Jerome Lowenthal
 Alexei Lubimov
 Nikolai Lugansky
 Jean-Marc Luisada
 Radu Lupu
 Moura Lympany
 Charles Lynch
 Clive Lythgoe

M

 Marcel Maas
 Frederik Magle
 Richard Markham
 Alan Marks
 Edwin McArthur
 Stephanie McCallum
 Leon McCawley
 Joanna MacGregor
 Murray McLachlan
 Geoffrey Douglas Madge
 Aleksandar Madžar
 Nikita Magaloff
 Gustav Mahler (piano rolls only; see discussion page)
 Petronel Malan
 Yevgeny Malinin
 Witold Małcużyński
 Plamena Mangova
 Wolfgang Manz
 Rosario Marciano
 Adele Marcus
 Israela Margalit
 Iren Marik
 Ozan Marsh
 Oleg Marshev
 Jean Martin
 Philip Martin
 Malcolm Martineau
 João Carlos Martins
 Jean-Pierre Marty
 Draga Matkovic
 Denis Matsuev
 Yuki Matsuzawa
 Andrew Matthews-Owen
 František Maxián
 Lincoln Mayorga
 Nikolai Medtner
 Alexander Melnikov
 Hephzibah Menuhin
 Yaltah Menuhin
 Yolanda Mero
 Frank Merrick
 Janne Mertanen
 Victor Merzhanov
 Noel Mewton-Wood
 Marcelle Meyer
 Stefano Miceli
 Aleksander Michałowski
 Arturo Benedetti Michelangeli
 Miloš Mihajlović
 Hamish Milne
 Vladimir Mischouk
 Yoko Misumi
 Gertrude Lightstone Mittelmann
 Evgeny Mogilevsky
 Benno Moiseiwitsch
 Gabriela Montero
 Sergio Monteiro
 Gerald Moore
 Ivan Moravec
 Leszek Możdżer
 Ian Munro
 Mieczysław Munz
 Roger Muraro
 William Murdoch
 Olli Mustonen

N

 William Grant Naboré
 Marina Nadiradze
 Jon Nakamatsu
 Hiroko Nakamura
 Alexei Nasedkin
 Soheil Nasseri
 Martha Naset
 Yves Nat
 Lev Natochenny
 Eldar Nebolsin
 Anton Nel
 Pascal Nemirovski
 Heinrich Neuhaus
 Stanislav Neuhaus
 Anthony Newman
 Elly Ney
 Reid N. Nibley
 Francesco Nicolosi
 Stanislas Niedzielski
 Mitja Nikisch
 Tatiana Nikolayeva
 Andrei Nikolsky
 Minoru Nojima
 David Owen Norris
 Eunice Norton
 Guiomar Novaes
 Marie Novello
 Theodosia Ntokou
 Ruth Nye
 Ervin Nyiregyházi

O

 Lev Oborin
 John O'Conor
 Noriko Ogawa
 John Ogdon
 Garrick Ohlsson
 Vikingur Olafsson
 Max Olding
 Janusz Olejniczak
 Gülsin Onay
 Bart van Oort
 Ursula Oppens
 Gerhard Oppitz
 Christopher O'Riley
 Míceál O'Rourke
 Lambert Orkis
 Leo Ornstein
 Rafael Orozco
 Cristina Ortiz
 Steven Osborne
 Alexander Osminin
 Alice Sara Ott
 Cécile Ousset
 Vladimir Ovchinnikov

P

 Ian Pace
 Vladimir de Pachmann
 Ignacy Jan Paderewski
 Pamela Page
 Kun-Woo Paik
 Piotr Paleczny
 Josef Páleníček
 Jon Kimura Parker
 Geoffrey Parsons
 Natalya Pasichnyk
 Güher Pekinel
 Süher Pekinel
 Leonard Pennario
 Murray Perahia
 Neal Peres Da Costa
 Alfredo Perl
 Vlado Perlemuter
 Vincent Persichetti
 Egon Petri
 Nikolai Petrov
 Christina Petrowska-Quilico
 Isidor Philipp
 Edith Picht-Axenfeld
 Andrzej Pikul
 Cecilia Pillado
 Maria João Pires
 Artur Pizarro
 Francis Planté
 Mikhail Pletnev
 Jonathan Plowright
 Ivo Pogorelić
 Daniel Pollack
 Maurizio Pollini
 Jean-Bernard Pommier
 Antonio Pompa-Baldi
 Michael Ponti
 Roland Pöntinen
 Paul Posnak
 Viktoria Postnikova
 Harrison Potter
 Leff Pouishnoff
 Francis Poulenc
 Jonathan Powell
 Awadagin Pratt
 Menahem Pressler
 André Previn
 Vassily Primakov
 Paul Procopolis - a pseudonym
 Sergei Prokofiev
 Roland Pröll
 Roberto Prosseda
 Svetla Protich
 Dana Protopopescu
 Raoul Pugno

Q
 Anne Queffélec

R

 Alexander Raab
 Sergei Rachmaninoff
 Karol Radziwonowicz
 Matti Raekallio
 Thomas Rajna
 Beatrice Rana
 Dezső Ránki
 Rein Rannap
 Ilya Rashkovsky
 Siegfried Rapp
 Michael Raucheisen
 Maurice Ravel
 Marjan Rawicz
 Alexander Raytchev
 Walter Rehberg
 Aribert Reimann
 Lívia Rév
 Alberto Reyes
 Sviatoslav Richter
 Hans Richter-Haaser
 Robert Riefling
 Joshua Rifkin
 Bernard Ringeissen
 Édouard Risler
 André Ristic
 Bernard Roberts
 Santiago Rodriguez,
 Pascal Rogé
 Michael Roll
 Helmut Roloff
 Aleksandra Romanić
 Landon Ronald
 Martin Roscoe
 Jerome Rose
 Charles Rosen
 Carol Rosenberger
 Moriz Rosenthal
 Mstislav Rostropovich
 Nicholas Roth
 Jacques Rouvier
 Gennady Rozhdestvensky
 Mūza Rubackytė
 Arthur Rubinstein
 Mikhail Rudy
 Antonio Ruiz-Pipò
 Walter Rummel
 Frederic Rzewski

S

 Geoffrey Saba
 Vasily Safonov
 Camille Saint-Saëns
 Pnina Salzman
 Olga Samaroff
 Harold Samuel
  Esteban Sánchez Herrero
 György Sándor
 Victor Sangiorgio
 Jesús Maria Sanromá
 Wassily Sapellnikoff
 David Saperton
 Alexander Satz
 Emil von Sauer
Jean-Marc Savelli
 Wolfgang Sawallisch
 Fazıl Say
 Ergican Saydam
 Pietro Scarpini
 Irene Scharrer
 Xaver Scharwenka
 Sergey Schepkin
 Olga Scheps
 Ann Schein Carlyss
 Valentin Schiedermair
 András Schiff
 Victor Schiøler
 Steffen Schleiermacher
 Burkard Schliessmann
 Peter Schmalfuss
 Helmut Schmidt
 E. Robert Schmitz
 Artur Schnabel
 Karl Ulrich Schnabel
 Edwin Schneider
 Andre-Michel Schub
 Alexander Scriabin
 Kathryn Selby
 Blanche Selva
 Pavel Serebryakov (Paul Serebriakov)
 Peter Serkin
 Rudolf Serkin
 Hüseyin Sermet
 Dimitris Sgouros
 Regina Shamvili
 Tatiana Shebanova
 Mordecai Shehori
 Howard Shelley
 Anatoly Sheludyakov
 Russell Sherman
 Norman Shetler
 Dmitri Shostakovich
 Naum Shtarkman
 Leonard Shure
 Valery Sigalevitch
 Antti Siirala
 Alexander Siloti
 Abbey Simon
 Leo Sirota
 Larry Sitsky
 Katia Skanavi
 Harrison Slater
 Ruth Slenczynska
 Alexander Slobodyanik
 Sigurd Slåttebrekk
 Regina Smendzianka
 Jan Smeterlin
 Leo Smit
 Cyril Smith
 Ronald Smith
 Wibi Soerjadi
 Evgeny Soifertis
 Vladimir Sofronitsky
 Grigory Sokolov
 Juan María Solare
 Solomon
 Yonty Solomon
 Georg Solti
 Wonny Song
 Gonzalo Soriano
 Pietro Spada
 Leslie Spotz
 Dubravka Tomšič Srebotnjak
 Peter Stadlen
 Martin Stadtfeld
 Andreas Staier
 Bernhard Stavenhagen
 Susan Starr
 Pavel Štěpán
 Edna Stern
 Eduard Steuermann
 Ronald Stevenson
 Kathryn Stott
 Richard Strauss
 Igor Stravinsky
 Soulima Stravinsky
 Yevgeny Sudbin
 Iyad Sughayer
 Grete Sultan
 Alexei Sultanov
 Mei-Ting Sun
 Sage Araneta
 Yingdi Sun
 Rose and Ottilie Sutro
 Yevgeny Svetlanov
 Ruslan Sviridov
 Tomáš Svoboda
 Jeffrey Swann
 David Syme
 Roberto Szidon
 Balázs Szokolay
 Władysław Szpilman

T

 Gabriel Tacchino
 Magda Tagliaferro
 Mark Taimanov
 Aki Takahashi
 Yūji Takahashi
 Ani Takidze
 Yaara Tal
 Rosa Tamarkina
 Alexander Tamir
 Melvyn Tan
 Rüya Taner
 Sergei Tarnowsky
 André Tchaikowsky
 Simon Tedeschi
 Per Tengstrand
 Louis Teicher
 Gerardo Teissonniere
 Alfred Teltschik
 Alexandre Tharaud
 Jean-Yves Thibaudet
 François-Joël Thiollier
 Penelope Thwaites
 Germaine Thyssens-Valentin
 Ignaz Tiegerman
 Sergio Tiempo
 Michael Tilson Thomas
 Hugh Tinney
 Maria Tipo
 Martino Tirimo
 James Tocco
 Dubravka Tomsic
 Alexander Toradze
 Donald Tovey
 Geoffrey Tozer
 Max Trapp
 Daniil Trifonov
 Malcolm Troup
 Simon Trpčeski
 Valerie Tryon
 Nobuyuki Tsujii
 Anna Tsybuleva
 David Tudor
 Rosalyn Tureck
 Ronald Turini
 Anderson Tyrer

U

 Zeynep Üçbaşaran
 Mitsuko Uchida
 Ayako Uehara
 Fredrik Ullén
 Imre Ungár
 Alexander Uninsky
 Rem Urasin
 Mihaela Ursuleasa

V

 Arbo Valdma
 Vladimir Valjarević
 Arie Vardi
 Tamás Vásáry
 Kosti Vehanen
 Ester Vela
 Eulalia Vela
 Ilana Vered
 Arielle Vernède
 Matthijs Verschoor
 José Vianna da Motta
 Vladimir Viardo
 Carlo Vidusso
 Roger Vignoles
 Ricardo Viñes
 Anna Vinnitskaya
 Lev Vinocour
 Eliso Virsaladze
 Stefan Vladar
 Pancho Vladigerov
 Lev Vlassenko
 Lars Vogt
 Aleksey Volodin
 Arcadi Volodos
 Andrew von Oeyen
 Franz Vorraber
 Ralph Votapek
 Vitya Vronsky

W

 Vanessa Wagner
 Bruno Walter
 Jue Wang
 Yuja Wang
 Theo Wangemann
 Andrzej Wasowski
 Ashley Wass
 Huw Watkins
 André Watts
 Janice Weber
 Beveridge Webster
 François Weigel
 Nancy Weir
 Alan Weiss
 Orion Weiss
 Alexis Weissenberg
 Ueli Wiget
 Earl Wild
 David Wilde
 Gerard Willems
 Llŷr Williams
 Malcolm Williamson
 Paul Wittgenstein
 Daniel Wnukowski
 Ernst Victor Wolff
 Eleanor Wong
 See Siang Wong
 Roger Woodward
 Bolesław Woytowicz
 Roger Wright
 Friedrich Wührer
 Klara Würtz

X
 Di Xiao

Y

 Oxana Yablonskaya
 Marina Yakhlakova 
 Vladimir Yampolsky
 Ivan Yanakov (pianist)
 Joyce Yang
 Ventsislav Yankoff
 Ramzi Yassa
 Anna Yesipova (Annette Essipova)
 Christine Yoshikawa
 Maria Yudina
 Li Yundi (see Li)

Z

 Franciszek Zachara
 Christian Zacharias
 Yakov Zak
 Berenika Zakrzewski
 Irina Zaritskaya
 Carlo Zecchi
 Dieter Zechlin
 Mark Zeltser
 Mélodie Zhao
 Zhu Xiao-Mei
 Igor Zhukov
 Lilya Zilberstein
 Krystian Zimerman
 Tadeusz Żmudziński

References 

 
classical pianists (recorded)
Classical music lists